The 1961–62 Montreal Canadiens season was the 53rd season in franchise history. The team placed first in the regular season to qualify for the playoffs. The Canadiens were eliminated in semi-finals by the Chicago Black Hawks 4 games to 2.

Regular season

Final standings

Record vs. opponents

Schedule and results

Playoffs

Semi-finals

Player statistics

Regular season
Scoring

Goaltending

Playoffs
Scoring

Goaltending

Awards and records

Transactions

See also
 1961–62 NHL season

References

External links
Canadiens on Hockey Database
Canadiens on NHL Reference

Montreal Canadiens seasons
Mon
Mon
1960s in Montreal
1961 in Quebec
1962 in Quebec